Church of the Magdalene is a church in Lisbon, Portugal. Its portal is classified as a National Monument.

History
The Magdalene Church that currently exists is the result of several reconstructions.  The original structure was erected in 1150 or 1164, by order of D. Afonso Henriques. In 1363, a fire completely destroyed the church, and Ferdinand I of Portugal had it rebuilt. In 1600 the church was partially destroyed by a cyclone. In 1755 the church was demolished by the 1755 Lisbon earthquake. In 1783 Queen Maria I of Portugal had to rebuild the church again. In 1833, the church underwent some changes.

The church portal, a Manueline trefoil arch that was salvaged intact following the 1755 Lisbon earthquake, was classified as a National Monument in 1910.

See also
Religious architecture
History of Lisbon

References

External links 

Roman Catholic churches in Lisbon
National monuments in Lisbon District